Banner Creek Summit is a mountain pass in the western United States in central Idaho, at an elevation of  above sea level. Traversed by State Highway 21, the Ponderosa Pine Scenic Byway,  it is located on the border of Custer County and Boise County, also the border of the Challis and Boise National Forests, immediately northwest of the Sawtooth Range.

Banner Creek Summit also marks the divide between the Salmon River and Payette River drainage areas. The highway follows Banner Creek, a tributary of the Middle Fork of the Salmon River, on the north side of the summit, and Canyon Creek (South Fork - Payette River) on the south side.

In road distance, the summit is about midway between Stanley and Lowman.  This section of SH-21 is usually not maintained during the winter months, due to light traffic and heavy snowfall.

References

External links
 Idaho Byways - Ponderosa Pine Scenic Byway

Mountain passes of Idaho
Landforms of Custer County, Idaho
Landforms of Boise County, Idaho
Transportation in Boise County, Idaho
Salmon-Challis National Forest
Boise National Forest